Potassium channel subfamily T, member 2, also known as KCNT2 is a human gene that encodes the KNa protein. KCNT2, also known as the Slick channel (sequence like an intermediate calcium channel) is an outwardly rectifying potassium channel activated by internal raises in sodium or chloride ions.

See also
 SK channel
 Voltage-gated potassium channel

References

Further reading

Ion channels